British girl group Little Mix have recorded material for six studio albums as well as non-album singles. They came to prominence after they won the eighth series of The X Factor in 2011, the first group to do so. Members Jade Thirlwall, Perrie Edwards, Leigh-Anne Pinnock, and Jesy Nelson originally entered the competition as solo acts, but were placed together to make a quartet during the initial stages of the auditions. A cover of "Cannonball" by Damien Rice was released as their winner's single.
After winning The X Factor, the group worked on their debut album, DNA, which was released on 19 November 2012. Its track "Wings" is a bubblegum pop and R&B song with elements of 1990s music. Lyrically, it is about self-empowerment and following one's dreams. The title track has a Gothic feel to it whereby Little Mix display a darker side to their personalities. The group worked with former Girls Aloud member, Nicola Roberts, on the Latin-inspired "Going Nowhere" and featured Missy Elliott on the single release version of pop-funk track "How Ya Doin'?". The latter track contains two samples: "Help Is On the Way" composed by James Stanley Carter and  "Name and Number" written by Curiosity Killed the Cat.

Little Mix's second studio album, Salute, was released on 8 November 2013. The group previously stated in March that the project would be more influenced by R&B than their previous album. "Move" was released as the lead single, and described by Digital Spy writer Lewis Corner as setting up their new urban creative direction "nicely." The title track makes use of a Blitzkrieg siren in its composition while lyrically it promotes female self-empowerment. "Nothing Feels Like You" adopts a Carnival feel while "Good Enough" is a piano ballad which deals with the process of being rejected by someone you have feelings for. The Guardian critic Harriet Gibsone described "Boy" as a revamped interpretation of N*SYNC's 2001 track "Gone". In March 2014, the group released a cover of Cameo's 1986 single "Word Up!" as the official Sport Relief charity single.

Get Weird, their third album, was released on 6 November 2015. With the exception of the "moody" trap track "Lightning", it saw the group return to a pop music style, though it was noted for its sexualised tone. The song "A.D.I.D.A.S." is an acronym for "All Day I Dream About Sex" and alludes to the sexual act of cunnilingus and fellatio in its lyrics. It also samples the line "hot love and emotion" from "Hold On, We're Going Home" performed by Drake; he, along with the song's other composers Noah "40" Shebib, Majid Al Maskati, Jordan Ullman and Anthony Jeffries, received songwriting credits as a result. "Love Me Like You" is a retro-Motown track reminiscent of Shadow Morton's work. NME writer Nick Levine noted that the lyrics "He was just a dick and I knew it" on "Hair" and "Your voice dropped and you thought you could handle me" on "Grown" were two examples of many "sassy" tracks on Get Weird.

Songs

See also
 Little Mix discography

Notes and sample credits

References

Little Mix